Jeerai is a village in Gogunda Tehsil in Udaipur district in the Indian state of Rajasthan. The District headquarter of the village is Udaipur.

Geography
It is 42 kilometers away from the Udaipur district headquarters.

Demographics
As per Population Census 2011, the total population of Jeerai is 371. Males constitute 51% of the population and females 49%.

Literacy 
The literacy rate of Jeerai village is 50.77% as per 2011 census which is very low compared to 66.11% of Rajasthan.

References

Villages in Udaipur district